In molecular biology, the protein domain Adenosine deaminase z-alpha domain  refers to an evolutionary conserved protein domain. This family consists of the N-terminus and thus the z-alpha domain of double-stranded RNA-specific adenosine deaminase (ADAR), an RNA-editing enzyme. The z-alpha domain is a Z-DNA binding domain, and binding of this region to B-DNA has been shown to be disfavoured by steric hindrance.

Function

Double-stranded RNA-specific adenosine deaminase (EC) converts multiple adenosines to inosines and creates I/U mismatched base pairs in double-helical RNA substrates without apparent sequence specificity. DRADA has been found to modify adenosines in AU-rich regions more frequently, probably due to the relative ease of melting A/U base pairs compared to G/C base pairs. The protein functions to modify viral RNA genomes, and may be responsible for hypermutation of certain negative-stranded viruses. DRADA edits the mRNAs for the glutamate receptor subunits by site-selective adenosine deamination. The DRADA repeat is also found in viral E3 proteins, which contain a double-stranded RNA-binding domain.

Examples 

Genes encoding proteins containing this domain include ADAR and ZBP1.

References

Protein domains